Tarik Hamilton O'Regan (born 1 January 1978) is a British and American composer. His compositions number over 100 and are partially represented on 43 recordings which have been recognised with two Grammy nominations. He is also the recipient of two British Composer Awards. O'Regan has served on the Faculties of Columbia University as a Fulbright Chester Schirmer Fellow, The Radcliffe Institute of Harvard University as a Radcliffe Fellow, Yale University, Trinity College in the University of Cambridge, Rutgers University, and the Institute for Advanced Study in Princeton as Director's Visitor.

O'Regan's compositions incorporate the influence of Renaissance vocal writing, the music of North Africa, British rock bands of the 1960s and 1970s, jazz and Minimalist music. His music is often rhythmically complex and employs varying approaches to tonality.

Life and work

1978–2001: Beginnings, early education, and influences
Tarik O'Regan was born in London in 1978. He grew up predominantly in Croydon in South London, to an English father of Irish descent and an Algerian mother, spending some of his early childhood in Algeria and Morocco, the latter where his mother was born. He was educated at Whitgift School then Pembroke College, Oxford, where he studied music and, in 1997, he received his first commissions from the Choir of New College, Oxford (conducted by Edward Higginbottom) and James Bowman. During this time, he studied composition privately with Jeremy Dale Roberts. 

Following completion of his undergraduate studies in 1999, he began serving as the classical recordings reviewer for The Observer newspaper, a position he held until 2003. At the same time he also worked for JPMorgan Chase, the investment bank. He completed his postgraduate studies under the direction of Robin Holloway at Cambridge, where he was appointed Composer in Residence at Corpus Christi College in 2000 and formally began his career as a composer, with his first published works appearing in 2001 on the Finnish Sulasol imprint.

2002–2011: Early compositional career
2002 marked two important London premieres: those of Clichés with the London Sinfonietta and The Pure Good of Theory with the BBC Symphony Orchestra. In 2004, O'Regan moved to New York City to take up the Chester Schirmer Fulbright Fellowship at Columbia University and subsequently a Radcliffe Institute Fellowship at Harvard. During this period, his composition Sainte won the Vocal category of the 2005 British Composer Awards and his debut disc, VOICES was released on the Collegium label.

Beginning in 2007, O'Regan began dividing his time between the UK and the US when he was appointed Fellow Commoner in the Creative Arts at Trinity College, Cambridge, a position he held until 2009. During his tenure at Cambridge, his composition Threshold of Night won the Liturgical category of the 2007 British Composer Awards and Scattered Rhymes, his first CD on the Harmonia Mundi label, performed by the Orlando Consort and the Estonian Philharmonic Chamber Choir conducted by Paul Hillier, was released in 2008.

O'Regan's second disc on the Harmonia Mundi label, Threshold of Night, appeared in late 2008 and awakened a wider interest in his work, demonstrated by the CD garnering two GRAMMY Award nominations in 2009: Best Classical Album, Best Choral Performance. After this, he increased his output as a music commentator in print and on air, especially on BBC Radio 3 and BBC Radio 4. This aspect of his career broadened with the broadcasting in 2010 on BBC Radio 4 of Composing New York, a documentary written and presented by O'Regan. In the same year, he was appointed to the Institute for Advanced Study in Princeton as a Director's Visitor and made his BBC Proms debut with Latent Manifest performed by the Royal Philharmonic Orchestra. O'Regan's third album on the Harmonia Mundi label, Acallam na Senórach: an Irish Colloquy (based on the 12th century Middle Irish narrative of the same name) was released in October 2011.

2011–present: Heart of Darkness, Mata Hari, The Phoenix and other works for the stage
In 2011, Heart of Darkness, O'Regan's chamber opera in one act, with an English-language libretto by artist Tom Phillips, based on the novella of the same name by Joseph Conrad was premiered at the Linbury Theatre of the Royal Opera House. The idea for the opera first came to O'Regan in 2001. It received wide critical attention and marked his first foray into operatic writing. A suite for orchestra and narrator was extrapolated from the opera and was given its London premiere by the Royal Philharmonic Orchestra and actor Samuel West in April 2013. 

In May 2015, Heart of Darkness received its North American premiere in a production by Opera Parallèle, presented by Z Space in San Francisco, California. Since the opera, O'Regan composed several pieces influenced by North Africa, which include his first collaborations with both the Dutch National Ballet and the Australian Chamber Orchestra. 

Recently,  some of his output has formed the focus of festivals such as the 2014 Vale of Glamorgan Festival and New Music for New Age from The Washington Chorus. O'Regan's first full-length ballet score (Mata Hari, based on the life of Margaretha Zelle MacLeod), commissioned by the Dutch National Ballet with choreography by Ted Brandsen, opened on 6 February 2016 in Amsterdam. On 30 September 2016 Mata Hari was released in DVD and Blu-ray formats by EuroArts, distributed by Warner Classics; the ballet will be revived for a further run in October, 2017.

In February 2017, O'Regan's first album of orchestral music, A Celestial Map of the Sky, performed by The Hallé under the direction of Sir Mark Elder and Jamie Phillips, was released on the NMC label. The album entered the British Official Charts at number seven in the Specialist Classical Chart and number 18 in the Classical Artist Albums Chart. In the same year he was elected both to an Honorary Fellowship of Pembroke College, Oxford, and to the board of Yaddo.

In 2019, O'Regan's opera The Phoenix with a libretto by John Caird was premiered at the Houston Grand Opera. The story was derived from the life of Mozart’s librettist, Lorenzo Da Ponte. Patrick Summers conducted the opera with Thomas Hampson and Luca Pisaroni playing Da Ponte at different stages of his life. The designs were by David Farley with lighting by Michael Clarke and choreography by Tim Claydon.  Tarik O'Regan was appointed Philharmonia Baroque Orchestra's first-ever Composer-in-Residence in 2021.

In 2023, O'Regan was announced as one of the composers who would each create a brand new piece for the Coronation of Charles III and Camilla.

Music

Style
O'Regan's music is mostly written in tonal, extended-tonal and modal languages (or a combination of all three), often with complicated rhythmic effects and dense textural variation.

Influences
In various radio and print interviews, O'Regan has stated that he "came to music quite late", mentioning the age of 13 as when he first was able to read music, and has listed five primary influences on his work:
 Renaissance vocal writing: from some of the repertoire performed by the college choirs at the Universities of Oxford and Cambridge where he was educated, although O'Regan describes himself as being "a pretty bad singer".
 The music of North Africa: from his own maternal heritage and time spent in Algeria and Morocco during his youth.
 British rock bands of the 1960s and 1970s: such as The Who and Led Zeppelin, first encountered in his mother's LP collection.
 Jazz: predominantly artists recorded on the Blue Note label in the 1950s and 1960s jazz, an interest first explored in his father's LP collection.
 Minimalist music

An article in The Irish Times on 23 November 2010 suggested that O'Regan is also interested in his Irish heritage. Published on the occasion of the first performance of Acallam na Senórach (a setting of The Middle Irish narrative of the same name), the article stated that Sir William Rowan Hamilton is a direct ancestor of O'Regan (his great-great-great-grandfather), whose middle name is Hamilton.

Critical reception
His 2006 debut disc, VOICES (Collegium Records COL CD 130), recorded by the Choir of Clare College, Cambridge, was released to critical acclaim, heralding O'Regan as "one of the most original and eloquent of young British composers" (The Observer, London), "breathing new life into the idiom" (The Daily Telegraph, London). International Record Review declared the recording "a committed, persuasive and highly accomplished performance of an exceptional composing voice of our time", while BBC Music Magazine gave the disc a double five-star rating.
Scattered Rhymes (2008), O'Regan's first disc from Harmonia Mundi, was described as "a stunning recording" (BBC Radio 3 CD Review), "exquisite and delicate" (The Washington Post), "a fascinating disc" (The Daily Telegraph, London) and "typically unfaultable" (BBC Music Magazine). After the June 2006 premiere of the eponymous work at the Spitalfields Festival, Geoff Brown, in The Times (London), described "O'Regan's gift for lyric flight [as] boundless. You might have to reach back to Vaughan Williams's Serenade to Music, or even Tallis, to find another British vocal work so exultant."
The 2008 release of Threshold of Night marked O'Regan's international breakthrough. The disc debuted at No. 10 on the Billboard chart and garnered two GRAMMY nominations in 2009 before going on to receive wide critical acclaim.
The 2010 BBC Proms premiere of Latent Manifest performed by the Royal Philharmonic Orchestra, conducted by Andrew Litton, was widely reviewed in London: "[a] personal canvas, taking us a long way from a literal reworking into the realms of evanescent fantasy, with delicately evocative results" (The Guardian, London), "a beguiling response to response itself – a mirage of intimations and allusions to [O'Regan's] own experience of hearing Bach's third solo Violin Sonata" (The Times, London), "a gracefully-controlled meditation on a single Bach phrase" (The Independent, London).
The premiere production of O'Regan's first opera, Heart of Darkness (2011), opened to largely positive reviews, both in print an online. Anna Picard described the opera as an "audacious, handsome debut"  in The Independent on Sunday and Stephen Pritchard, in The Observer, explained that "the brilliance of [the] opera lies in its ability to convey all that horror without the compulsion to show it – the ultimate psychodrama – and to employ music of startling beauty to tell such a brutal tale". Pritchard also described the music as "a score of concise originality". For a full account of the critical response to the opera, see Heart of Darkness (opera).
 The 2017 release of A Celestial Map of the Sky, O'Regan's first orchestral album, was widely reviewed: "Luminous beauty ... glows with jewel-like warmth" (The Observer); "This is a good sampling that shows the range of O'Regan's work ... these would seem pieces that are soon to enter a great many orchestral and choral repertories. Highly recommended." (AllMusic); "A splendid and highly recommended programme of music." (Composition Today)
 O'Regan was included in The Washington Post's annual list of "composers, performers and artists hitting their stride with work that resonates with the right now" for 2022.

Publications and works list
Tarik O'Regan's earliest works were published by Oxford University Press and Sulasol; since 2004 his music has been exclusively published by Novello & Company, part of the Music Sales group of companies.

Stage

 (2021) Mata Hari (ballet, reduced orchestra version)
 (2018) The Phoenix (opera)
 (2016) Mata Hari (ballet)
 (2013) The Wanton Sublime (monodrama)
 (2011) Heart of Darkness (opera)

Orchestra

 (2022) Recalcitrance (excerpted from Trances)
 (2022) Trances
 (2012) Chaâbi
 (2012) Fragments from a Heart of Darkness (full orchestra version)
 (2012) Suite from Heart of Darkness for narrator and full orchestra
 (2011) Raï (orchestra version)
 (2010) Latent Manifest
 (2008) Maybe we have time
 (2004) Hudson Lullaby

Orchestra with soloist

 (2022) Machine for saxophone and string orchestra
 (2014) Corsair for oud and orchestra
 (2000) The Pure Good of Theory for violin and orchestra

Orchestra with chorus

 (2022) The Quickening
 (2021) No one can hear themselves staying
 (2015) A Letter of Rights
 (2014) A Celestial Map of the Sky
 (2012) After Rain (Petrichor)
 (2011) Solitude Trilogy
 (2011) The Ecstasies Above (orchestra version, arranged by Daniel Moreira)
 (2008) Care Charminge Sleepe (orchestra version)
 (2008) Martyr
 (2007) Stolen Voices
 (2005) And There Was a Great Calm
 (2005) Triptych
 (2004) Threnody

Chamber ensemble

 (2022) The Golden Measure (from Ancestor, with Errollyn Wallen)
 (2016) Gradual (revised 2021)
 (2013) Virelai: Douce Dame Jolie (recorder quartet version)
 (2012) Fragments from a Heart of Darkness (chamber ensemble version)
 (2012) Suite from Heart of Darkness for narrator and chamber ensemble
 (2011) A Ducal Fanfare
 (2010) A Drifting Life
 (2008) Darkness Visible
 (2008) The Woven Child
 (2006) Raï
 (2005) Fragment for String Quartet
 (2005) Fragments from a Gradual Process

Chamber ensemble with chorus

 (2016) Mass Observation
 (2013) Blessed are they
 (2010) The Night's Untruth
 (2009) The Eyes of the Stars
 (2008) Threshold of Light
 (2007) The Taxi
 (2006) The Ecstasies Above

Chorus

 (2020) The Stillness Chained
 (2019) Facing West
 (2018) Keep
 (2017) All things common
 (2017) As One
 (2016) Turn
 (2016) I Listen to the Stillness of You' from Mass Observation (2015) Itself is all the like it has (2014) Tell me (2014) Love Reckons By Itself Alone (2012) All Creation Slept (2012) Ecce Puer (2012) Night City (2011) Beloved, all things ceased (2011) fleeting, God (2010) Acallam na Senórach (2010) Death is gonna lay his cold icy hands on me (2010) Swing Low, sweet chariot (2009) Jubilate Deo (Latin setting)
 (2009) Martyr Dei (Martyr of God) from Sequence for St Wulfstan (2009) No Matter (2009) The Great Silence (2009) That music always round me (2008) Nunc Dimittis (for double chorus)
 (2008) Se lamentar augelli (2008) The Spring from Acallam na Senórach (2008) The St Andrews Responsories (2008) Voce mea (2007) A Light Exists in Spring (2007) Ipsa vivere (2007) Jubilate Deo (English Version)
 (2007) Puer natus est (2007) Tal vez tenemos tiempo (2007) Two Emily Dickinson Settings (2007) Virelai: Douce dame jolie (2006) Hymnus de Sancte Andree Apostole (Hymn of Saint Andrew the Apostle) from Sequence for St Wulfstan (2006) I sleep, but my heart waketh (2006) Israfel (2006) Scattered Rhymes (2006) Threshold of Night (2006) The Windows (2005) Haec deum celi (Thou the true Virgin Mother of the Highest) from Sequence for St Wulfstan (2005) Lamentation (2005) We Remember Them (2004) Alleluia, laus et gloria (2004) Bring rest, sweet dreaming child (2004) Dorchester Canticles (2004) Gloria (2003) Beatus auctor sæculi (Blest author of this earthly frame) from Sequence for St Wulfstan (2003) O vera digna hostia (O Thou from whom hell's monarch flies) from Sequence for St Wulfstan (2003) Tu claustra stirpe regia (O Thou, from regal ancestry) from Sequence for St Wulfstan (2003) Tu, trinitatis unitas (You oneness of the Trinity) from Sequence for St Wulfstan (2002) Cantate Domino (2002) Surrexit Christus (2001) Agnus Dei (2001) Corpus Christi Service (2001) I Saw Him Standing (2001) Magnificat and Nunc Dimittis (2000) Care Charminge Sleepe (2000) Gratias tibi (1999) Ave Maria (1999) Columba aspexit (1999) Locus isteSolo instrumental

 (2016) Chorale Prelude on 'Wenn dich Unglück tut greifen an
 (2014) Alice Changes
 (2013) Fallen words
 (2012) Eminent Domains
 (2010) Parsing Variations
 (2008) Postlude for organ from Threshold of Light
 (2005) Lines of Desire
 (2004) Textures
 (1999) Colimaçon
 (1999) Three Piano Miniatures

Solo voice

 (2021) Seen & Unseen
 (2020) When I go away from you (The Taxi)
 (2012) Now Fatal Change
 (2009) The Sorrow of True Love
 (2009) Love raise your voice
 (2005) Three Motion Settings
 (2002) Sainte
 (1999) The Appointment
 (1998) The Tongue of Epigrams

Electroacoustic

 (2014) Scattered Rhymes (dance version; collaboration with Nick Wales)

Discography

Filmography

Awards and recognition
 2005 British Composer Award (Vocal category) for Sainte
 2007 British Composer Award for (Liturgical category) for Threshold of Night
 2009 Two Grammy Award nominations (Best Classical Album and Best Choral Performance) for Threshold of Night
 2009 NEA Artistic Excellence Grant for Heart of Darkness
 2011 Bronze Award at the 2011 World's Best Radio Programs Awards in New York.
 2017 Elected to the board of Yaddo
 2017 Honorary Fellowship of Pembroke College, Oxford

Notes

References
Tarik O'Regan's Novello & Company works catalogue (2004–present)
Tarik O'Regan's Oxford University Press works catalogue (1999–2003)

External links
Official website (www.tarikoregan.com)
Publisher website

1978 births
Living people
20th-century classical composers
20th-century English composers
20th-century British male musicians
20th-century British musicians
21st-century classical composers
21st-century English composers
21st-century British male musicians
English classical composers
English male classical composers
English expatriates in the United States
English people of Irish descent
English people of Algerian descent
Musicians from London
Alumni of Corpus Christi College, Cambridge
Alumni of Pembroke College, Oxford
JPMorgan Chase people
People educated at Whitgift School
Radcliffe fellows
The Observer people